Shen Lijuan (born 4 July 1958) is a Chinese female former track and field athlete who competed in the shot put. She is a three-time Asian champion and a former Asian record holder for the event.

Shen was the first Chinese woman to have international success in the shot put. She was the first woman to throw beyond seventeen metres at either event.

This standard was far short of the Eastern European woman who reached the podium at the Moscow Games. He rise of national rival Li Meisu saw her fall back into the silver medal position at the 1982 Asian Games, however, as Li broke Shen's former record. In her last major appearance (and first global one) she was eliminated in qualifying at the 1983 World Championships in Athletics.

International competitions

References

External links

Living people
1958 births
Chinese female shot putters
Asian Games gold medalists for China
Asian Games silver medalists for China
Asian Games medalists in athletics (track and field)
Athletes (track and field) at the 1978 Asian Games
Athletes (track and field) at the 1982 Asian Games
World Athletics Championships athletes for China
Medalists at the 1978 Asian Games
Medalists at the 1982 Asian Games
20th-century Chinese women